Warrick Lee "Mac" McCallion (26 July 1950 – 14 March 2018) was a New Zealand rugby union player and coach.

McCallion served in the Royal New Zealand Infantry Regiment of the New Zealand Army during the Vietnam War. Aged 17, and having lied about his age to enlist, he was a member of the secret Faceless 26 Ghost Unit of the New Zealand Special Air Service.

After the war, he played for Counties from 1976 to 1980, and made eight appearances for New Zealand Māori in the late 1970s.

McCallion was named New Zealand coach of the year for his work with the NPC Division One team Counties in both 1996 and 1997. He enhanced his reputation further as Graham Henry's assistant at the Auckland Blues during a four-year spell that saw them reach three consecutive Super 12 finals, lifting the trophy on two occasions in 1997 and 1998.

McCallion was appointed Fiji's national coaching director in March 2002. He took the Fiji national team to the 2003 Rugby World Cup, but quit later that year, citing frustration at Fiji being overlooked for tournaments by the stronger rugby nations.

McCallion died in Manurewa on 14 March 2018 after a battle with cancer. He was survived by his wife Suzie, two children Dion and Zeb, one step-child Bowen and daughter in law Robyn. He has 5 grandchildren.

Notes

References

1950 births
2018 deaths
New Zealand rugby union players
Māori All Blacks players
New Zealand Army personnel
New Zealand military personnel of the Vietnam War
Fiji national rugby union team coaches
New Zealand expatriates in Fiji
Deaths from cancer in New Zealand
Counties Manukau rugby union players
Rugby union number eights
Rugby union flankers
New Zealand rugby union coaches